Kim Clijsters and Ai Sugiyama were the defending champions, but Sugiyama did not compete this year. Clijsters teamed up with her sister Elke Clijsters and lost in quarterfinals to Émilie Loit and Petra Mandula.

Cara Black and Els Callens won the title by defeating Myriam Casanova and Eleni Daniilidou 6–2, 6–1 in the final.

Seeds

Draw

Draw

References
 Official results archive (ITF)
 Official results archive (WTA)

2004 Doubles
Proximus Diamond Games
Proximus Diamond Games